Wollaston's roundleaf bat (Hipposideros wollastoni) is a species of bat in the family Hipposideridae. It is found in West Papua, Indonesia and Papua New Guinea. It was named after the explorer Sandy Wollaston.

Taxonomy and etymology
It was described as a new species in 1913 by British zoologist Oldfield Thomas. The eponym for the species name "wollastoni" is A. F. R. Wollaston. The holotype used to describe this species was collected during one of Wollaston's expeditions to New Guinea.

Description
In his initial description of the species, Thomas noted that it was similar in appearance to the Fly River roundleaf bat, Hipposideros muscinus.
It differs from the Fly River roundleaf bat in that its posterior nose-leaf has a "peculiar duplication" behind it.

Range and status
This species is only known from the island of New Guinea, in both Indonesia and Papua New Guinea. It has been found in montane forests, oak forests, and secondary forests.

It is currently evaluated as least concern by the IUCN—its lowest conservation priority.

References

Hipposideros
Bats of Oceania
Mammals of Papua New Guinea
Mammals of Western New Guinea
Mammals described in 1913
Taxa named by Oldfield Thomas
Taxonomy articles created by Polbot
Bats of New Guinea